Firepower is an alias used by two supervillains appearing in American comic books published by Marvel Comics.

The character has made minor appearances across several media, such as animated television and the live-action Marvel Cinematic Universe film Iron Man 3, in which he was portrayed by Ashley Hamilton.

Fictional character biography

Jack Taggert

Jack Taggert worked on an experimental pilotable suit for Project: Firepower for Edwin Cord (a rival businessman of Tony Stark). The project was ostensibly designated by the U.S. Armed Forces, in conjunction with Senator Boynton, to serve as an ultimate deterrent against opponents of the United States. However, when Iron Man launched his "Armor Wars", attacking armored villains and even government agents without provocation, the Firepower program was modified with the specific goal of stopping Iron Man. While Taggert continued to train for the fight with Iron Man using a simulator rig, Boynton invited Tony Stark out to the first formal demonstration of the Firepower suit, believing that Iron Man would somehow find out from his "ex-employer", and hoping to lure the rogue Avenger into a trap. Stark chose to observe the tests from an SE helicopter, piloted by Jim Rhodes, thus allowing Stark to slip away as Iron Man and attack Firepower without his absence being noticed by Boynton or the military.  The tests against tank and jet drones proved so devastating, however, that Rhodey suggested aborting; however, determined to destroy every last bit of Iron Man technology not under his control, Stark joined the fight. Iron Man found that the massive Firepower suit was able to withstand his attacks, and Firepower was even able to ambush Iron Man through a canyon wall. When Iron Man placed a Negator pack (the device he used to disable his armor technology) on Firepower, he was surprised to find out it didn't work - the government had studied the Negator pack that Iron Man had attempted to use on Stingray, and found a way to shield Firepower's circuits from the pack's effects. Badly damaged and wounded, Iron Man retreated to the helicopter, hoping to buy some time. However, Stark and Rhodey quickly realized that the military would consider them "acceptable losses" in stopping Iron Man, so just as Taggert was being ordered to target the chopper, Iron Man flew away. Taggert launched the "Terminax", a low-power nuclear missile, and completely destroyed the Iron Man armor, leaving its bloody bits to fall to the desert floor.

Stark had faked Iron Man's death by sending out the "Silver Centurion" armor on autopilot, filled with the store of spare blood they had kept on board the chopper "just in case", so as to allow the world to believe that Iron Man was dead (Stark's injuries were blamed on the shockwave from the Terminax detonation). Stark was content to leave Iron Man dead, but it was during this time that Edwin Cord took advantage. He blackmailed Boynton and the military into allowing him to keep Firepower, threatening to reveal to the press one of Firepower's "true" purposes - riot control. Cord then used Firepower to threaten the Marsten Manufacturing group to turn down a Stark bid, to attack SE division Acutech, and to personally attack and threaten Tony Stark and his workers. Finally having had enough of Firepower, Stark locked himself inside his private laboratory to build a brand new set of armor, incorporating several improvements and new weapons, as well as the "classic" red-and-gold color scheme. Even as the new armor was completed, Firepower was attacking another Stark Enterprises-owned facility, so Stark quickly faced off against Firepower as the "new" Iron Man. Taggert, convinced that he could dispatch this new Iron Man as quickly as he did the "first", was stunned to find the Firepower armor outclassed by his opponent. Iron Man was able to defeat or neutralize all of Firepower's main weapons. In a desperate, last-ditch attempt to win, Taggert activated the Terminax to launch without a set target, hoping that Iron Man would be vaporized in the attempt to stop or redirect the missile. However, the launcher backpack that housed the missile had been damaged by Iron Man's pulse bolts, trapping the Terminax and threatening everybody in the vicinity. Taggert pleaded with Iron Man to free him from the armor, but Iron Man told him that if the armor was magnetically sealed, there was nothing he could do to free him. Iron Man used an electromagnetic pulse - a trick learned from Force - to disable the Firepower armor (and his own) for six minutes. This bought Iron Man enough time to find a way to shut down the nuke's timer once the armors' systems came back online. Upon reboot, the timer had nine seconds left; Iron Man successfully stopped it in eight. Taggert, now no longer fearing being blown up, told Iron Man that there would be others just like him that would be out to kill Iron Man just as he had and destroy Stark Enterprises, whereupon Iron Man ripped the Firepower armor apart, stunning Taggert into acquiescence. Taggert and Cord were taken into custody, while Stark decided that the world still needed an Iron Man.

Taggert later resurfaces where he pilots a new Firepower armor given to him by Mandarin when he is recruited to help Iron Man's other enemies defeat Iron Man.

David Roberts
A second Firepower is a government official named David Roberts who was sent to bring down Atom-Smasher, an eco-terrorist who had sought to make illegal dumping grounds on a property owned by Stane International (used for government projects) and came to the attention of the media, prompting high-ranking government officials, fearing a scandal, to order Atom Smasher eliminated. Sleeker than the original, this Firepower actually has fewer weapons but seems to pack a harder punch with them. Firepower engaged Atom Smasher and was holding his own. Then, War Machine decided to end the fight with an EMP blast that rendered both inoperable until their systems rebooted. Since Firepower's auto reboots after 14 minutes while War Machine's rebooted in 6 minutes, Rhodes carried the suit out to the army detail outside of the Stane Facility and ordered them off the property.

Powers and abilities
Firepower’s armor provides him with a high degree of protection from energy and physical attacks. His strength, reflexes and endurance have all been enhanced by his armor and he can fly at sub-sonic speeds. The suit is also air conditioned to prevent discomfort for the operator. The Firepower armor contains a vast array of sensors and an impressive array of weapons including four back-mounted surface-to-air missiles (and additional missiles mounted on leg hardpoints), chest-mounted heat beam lasers, mini-grenades and arm-mounted concussive cannons. The armor can also fire a small tactical nuclear missile known as Terminax from a back-mounted launch tube.  Described as a "two-ton tuxedo" by Jack Taggart, the suit was extremely large and its wearer had to be lifted into it with a special crane.

Other versions
The Ultimate Universe equivalent of Firepower is the codename for a London Metropolitan Police riot squad in power armor based on Iron Man's stolen technology. Iron Man intervenes when the Firepower armor is used against peaceful protesters, and with Justine Hammer's help provides the British Government with proof that the designs the Government purchased were stolen, leading to them being recalled. Their armor has a striking resemblance to the Mark VI MJOLNIR armor from the Halo series.

In other media

Television
 Firepower appeared in the Iron Man episode "The Armor Wars, Part 2", voiced by Efrem Zimbalist, Jr. This version is an automaton built by Justin Hammer.
 Firepower appears in the Iron Man: Armored Adventures episode "Armor Wars". This version is an unnamed criminal hired by Obadiah Stane and passed off as the third member of the heroic Guardsmen alongside Force and Shockwave. However, Pepper Potts exposes the Guardsmen's criminal ties on live television before Iron Man and War Machine defeat them.

Film
Jack Taggert appears in Iron Man 3, portrayed by Ashley Hamilton. This version is a soldier recruited by Aldrich Killian to participate in the Extremis program. At the TCL Chinese Theatre, Taggert meets with Eric Savin, who gives him a number of injections. Upon using one and overdosing however, Taggert's Extremis virus malfunctions, causing him to explode, which injures Happy Hogan while Savin's regenerative capabilities protect him from the blast.

Video games
Firepower appears in the PSP, Wii, and mobile versions of the Iron Man 2 film tie-in game, voiced by Cedric Yarbrough. This version is a mercenary who joins A.I.M. in attacking Budapest before fighting War Machine.

References

External links
 Firepower I at Marvel.com

Comics characters introduced in 1993
Comics characters introduced in 1988
Marvel Comics supervillains
Characters created by David Michelinie
Fictional aviators
Fictional African-American people
Fictional government agents
Characters created by Bob Layton
Fictional mercenaries in comics
Iron Man characters